Korakochori ( meaning "crow village") is a village and a community in the municipality of Pyrgos, Elis, Greece.  In 2011, the village had a population of 213 and the community 281, which includes the small villages Agios Andreas, Kallithea and Bouka. It is located by the Ionian Sea, 2 km southwest of Leventochori, 3 km north of Katakolo and 11 km west of Pyrgos town centre.

Population

See also

List of settlements in Elis

External links
Korakochori at the GTP Travel Pages

References

Pyrgos, Elis
Populated places in Elis